André Andrade Vieira (born 31 January 1974) is a Brazilian former footballer who played as a midfielder.

Honours
Grêmio
Campeonato Brasileiro Série A: 1996
Copa do Brasil: 1994, 1997
Campeonato Gaúcho: 1995, 1996
Copa Libertadores: 1995

References

1974 births
Living people
Brazilian footballers
Association football midfielders
Campeonato Brasileiro Série A players
Moldovan Super Liga players
Liga I players
Grêmio Foot-Ball Porto Alegrense players
FC Lugano players
Paysandu Sport Club players
Ponta Grossa Esporte Clube players
Sociedade Esportiva do Gama players
FC Zimbru Chișinău players
Fortaleza Esporte Clube players
ASC Oțelul Galați players
Associação Chapecoense de Futebol players
Brazilian expatriate footballers
Expatriate footballers in Switzerland
Brazilian expatriate sportspeople in Switzerland
Expatriate footballers in Moldova
Brazilian expatriate sportspeople in Moldova
Expatriate footballers in Romania
Brazilian expatriate sportspeople in Romania
Footballers from Porto Alegre